Bloomfield is a town in the Shire of Cook and a coastal locality which is split between the Shire of Cook and the Shire of Douglas in Queensland, Australia. The neighbourhood of Ayton is within the locality.

The neighbourhood of China Camp is an abandoned tin mining area within the locality.

Geography
The locality of Bloomfield is geographically divided into a northern section in the Shire of Cook and a southern section in the Shire of Douglas.

Much of the northern section of Bloomfield is within the Ngalba Bulal National Park. Much of the southern section of Bloomfield is within the Ngalba Bulal National Park and the Daintree National Park.

Although Bloomfield is officially the population centre, in practice, there is little there apart from the school. Most of the development is in Ayton, on the northern bank of the Bloomfield River near its mouth.

History
Yalanji  (also known as Kuku Yalanji, Kuku Yalaja, Kuku Yelandji, and Gugu Yalanji) is an Australian Aboriginal language of Far North Queensland. The traditional language region is Mossman River in the south to the Annan River in the north, bordered by the Pacific Ocean in the east and extending inland to west of Mount Mulgrave. This includes the local government boundaries of the Shire of Douglas, the Shire of Cook and the Aboriginal Shire of Wujal Wujal and the towns and localities of Cooktown,  Mossman, Daintree, Cape Tribulation and Wujal Wujal. It includes the head of the Palmer River, the Bloomfield River, China Camp, Maytown, and Palmerville.

The town and locality are named after the Bloomfield River.

The Bloomfield River Sugar Company was established in 1882 by Frederick Bauer and his two sons. They established a sugarcane plantation that they called Vilele. The sugar mill they constructed did its first full-scale crush in 1885. In 1886 they built a saw mill and had  of tramway built from portable track. The sugar mill closed in 1890 as it proved to be not economic.

Ayton Provisional School opened on the road from Cape Tribulation to Cooktown circa 1897. On 1 January 1909 it became Ayton State School. It 1924 it was closed due to low student numbers.

Bloomfield River State School opened on 16 July 1952.

In the 2011 census, Bloomfield had a population of 403 people.

Prior to the deamalgamation of Shire of Douglas on 1 January 2014, Bloomfield was split between Shire of Cook and Cairns Region.

Facilities 
Cook Shire Council operates a public library in Ayton.

Education 
Bloomfield River State School is a government primary (Prep-6) school for boys and girls at 3202 Rossville-Bloomfield Road. In 2017, the school had an enrolment of 41 students with 6 teachers and 9 non-teaching staff (5 full-time equivalent).

The nearest secondary school is in Cooktown (approximately 1 hour away).

See also
 List of tramways in Queensland

References

Further reading

 

Towns in Queensland
Shire of Cook
Shire of Douglas
Coastline of Queensland
Localities in Queensland